Craterodiscus pricei is a species of air-breathing land snail, a terrestrial pulmonate gastropod mollusk in the family Camaenidae. This species is endemic to Australia.

References 

Gastropods of Australia
Craterodiscus
Gastropods described in 1958
Taxonomy articles created by Polbot